Which Way Home is a 1991 mini series about a nurse who flees Cambodia.

References

External links

Review at EW

1990s Australian television miniseries
1991 Australian television series debuts
1991 Australian television series endings